Dragonfly is a 2001 Norwegian drama film directed by Marius Holst, starring Kim Bodnia, Mikael Persbrandt and Maria Bonnevie. It is based on the short story "Natt Til Mørk Morgen" by Ingvar Ambjørnsen.

Synopsis 
A couple moves out on the country to try to leave their past behind, but the past catches up with them.

External links 
 
 
 Interview about Dragonfly by the BBC

2001 films
2001 drama films
Films directed by Marius Holst
Norwegian drama films
2000s Norwegian-language films